The Carrollton Historic District in Carrollton, Kentucky is a  historic district which was listed on the National Register of Historic Places in 1982.  The listing included 334 contributing buildings.  The district is roughly bounded by Main, Polk, 2nd, 7th, and both sides of Highland Ave. to 11th St.

It includes the Carroll County Courthouse, designed by the McDonald Brothers of Louisville.

References

Historic districts on the National Register of Historic Places in Kentucky
National Register of Historic Places in Carroll County, Kentucky
Victorian architecture in Kentucky
Italianate architecture in Kentucky
Carrollton, Kentucky